Paula 'Pola' Roberts (1938) is an American jazz drummer.
Roberts is an autodidact who started on the bongo and finally started playing drums on her 17th.

Gloria Coleman, a female band leader, organist and spouse of George Coleman, discovered Roberts and hired her to play in her band that consisted entirely of women. In 1963, organist Gloria Coleman regularly played with her in a quartet in a bar (Branker's) in upper Harlem. The presence of two female musicians in a small group also gave the title to the album Soul Sisters (Impulse).
Later she moved to New York and played with Art Blakey, Stanley Turrentine, Max Roach, George Benson and Jack Mc Duff.

Discography

As sidewoman
Soul Sisters (Impulse!, 1963) with Gloria Coleman.

References
 Pittsburgh Jazz (2007, John M. Brewer Jr.)
 The House That Trane Built: The Story of Impulse Records (2007, Ashley Kahn)

External links
 Picture of Roberts on the cover of Soul Sisters. Soul Sisters
 Picture of Roberts with 'Pixie Bongo 4 Jewel's', Pittsburgh, Pennsylvania, 1950. 
 Picture of Roberts with the Horace Turner Trio, 1960. 
 Picture of Roberts with Bill Brown, Pola Roberts, Dick Shelton.  (scroll downwards)

Living people
1938 births
American jazz drummers
20th-century American drummers